Louis Brassin (24 June 184017 May 1884) was a Belgian pianist, composer and music educator.  He is best known now for his piano transcription of the Magic Fire Music from Wagner's Die Walküre.

Career
Louis Brassin was born in Aix-la-Chapelle in 1840.  His father was a baritone named de Brassine, whose career took him and his family abroad.  Louis gave his first concert at the age of six, in Hamburg. At age seven he entered the Leipzig Conservatory as a pupil of Ignaz Moscheles.  In 1852 he went on concert tours with his two brothers.  In 1857 he adopted the surname Brassin.  In 1866-67 he taught at the Stern Conservatory in Berlin, succeeding Hans von Bülow, then resumed concertising. He was piano professor at the Brussels Conservatoire 1868-78, and played an important role in the musical life of the country. Among his pupils there were Edgar Tinel, Arthur De Greef, Franz Rummel and Alfred Wotquenne. In 1878 he took over the piano class of Theodor Leschetizky at the Saint Petersburg Conservatory, where his pupils included Vasily Safonov, Wassily Sapellnikoff and Genary Korganov.

He died in Saint Petersburg in 1884, aged 43.

Transcriptions
Brassin's piano transcription of the Magic Fire Music from Wagner's Die Walküre was long a concert favourite, and has been recorded many times.  His other Wagner transcriptions from the Ring Cycle were: Valhalla, Siegmund's Love Song, Ride of the Valkyries (Die Walküre), and Forest Murmurs (Siegfried).  Pianists who have recorded these pieces include Josef Hofmann, Ignaz Friedman, Isador Goodman, Michael Ponti, Jean-Yves Thibaudet and Severin von Eckardstein.

He also transcribed:
 J. S. Bach's Toccata and Fugue in D minor, BWV 565
 the Soldiers' Chorus from Gounod's Faust
 3 pieces after Domenico Scarlatti.

Original works
Brassin wrote two piano concertos and two German operettas (Der Thronfolger, The Heir to the Throne and Der Missionär, The Missionary), as well as many smaller, now largely forgotten piano pieces.

 Première grande polonaise
 Deuxième grande polonaise, Op. 18
 3eme Grande Polonaise
 Feuillet d'album (Album Leaf)
 Étude de concert
 Impressions d'Automne (Herbst-Eindrücke) Trois etudes
 Menuet, Gavotte et Gigue
 Polka de la Princesse
 Sérénade
 Rêverie pastoral
 Rêverie
 Second Galop de Concert fantastique
 Les Adieux, morceau caractéristiques
 Grandes Etudes de Concert. Op. 12 [No. 1-6]
 Mazurka de Salon, Op. 14
 Au clair de la lune, Nocturne, Op. 17

References

Sources
 Harold C. Schonberg, The Great Pianists, pp. 269, 342
 Eric Blom, ed., Grove Dictionary of Music and Musicians, 5th ed, 1954, Vol. 1, p. 918

External links
 

1840 births
1884 deaths
19th-century classical composers
19th-century classical pianists
19th-century Belgian male musicians
Belgian classical composers
Belgian classical pianists
Belgian male classical composers
Belgian music educators
Composers for piano
Male classical pianists
People from Aachen
Piano pedagogues
Academic staff of the Royal Conservatory of Brussels
University of Music and Theatre Leipzig alumni